Klavs is a predominantly Danish masculine given name; a variant of Klaus. People bearing the name Klavs include:
Klavs Jørn Christensen (born 1961), Danish sport shooter
Klavs F. Jensen (born 1952), Danish chemical engineer 
Klavs Bruun Jørgensen (born 1974), Danish handball player and coach 
Klavs Neerbek (born 1944), Danish author, entrepreneur. chemist and interlingua promoter 
Klavs Randsborg (1913–2016), Danish archaeologist
Klavs Rasmussen (born 1966), Danish football manager

References

Masculine given names
Danish masculine given names